The German Colonial Society (DKG) was a German organisation formed on 19 December 1887 to promote German colonialism. The Society was headquartered in Berlin.

The German Colonial Society worked in close cooperation with the Pan-German League and became influential in the German Empire. Among its leaders were Hermann, Prince of Hohenlohe-Langenburg, Carl Peters and several members of parliament. Upon its formation the Society had approximately 15,000 members and by 1914 the number of members had increased to 42,000. The foremost goal of the Society was to work for a more expansive German colonial policy. From 1916 plans were made for a German colonial empire in Africa, the so-called , as well as annexations in East Asia. After Germany lost its colonies at the end of the First World War, the Society propagated for their reoccupation.

The society took over the recently founded  in 1900.

When the Nazi party seized power in Germany, it was decided that a new Society under its direct control was to be created.

See also

References

Bibliography

issued by the society
 Deutsche Kolonialzeitung via HathiTrust 

about the society

External links
 Der Bildbestand der Deutschen Kolonialgesellschaft in the Frankfurt University Library

Images

Defunct organisations based in Germany
1887 establishments in the German colonial empire
Organizations established in 1887
Organizations disestablished in 1936
1936 disestablishments in Germany
Organisations based in Berlin
Organizations of the German Empire